Kaspars Daugaviņš (born May 18, 1988) is a Latvian professional ice hockey player who is currently an unrestricted free agent. He most recently played with Iserlohn Roosters of the Deutsche Eishockey Liga (DEL). Daugaviņš has played professionally in the National Hockey League (NHL) for the Ottawa Senators and Boston Bruins. The Senators selected him in the third round, 91st overall, in the 2006 NHL Entry Draft.

Playing career
As a youth, Daugaviņš played in the 2002 Quebec International Pee-Wee Hockey Tournament with a team from Riga.

Professional
After the Majors failed to qualify for the playoffs in the 2006–07 season, the Ottawa Senators assigned Daugaviņš to the Binghamton Senators to finish the season. In 11 games with Binghamton, Daugaviņš had two goals, both coming against the Albany River Rats goaltender Tyler Weiman in a 5–4 Binghamton win. On June 1, 2007, Daugaviņš signed a three-year, entry level contract with the Ottawa Senators.

He spent the 2009–10 with Binghamton, scoring 21 goals and 46 points in 72 games as the team club failed to reach the playoffs. Daugaviņš also made his NHL debut on January 14, 2010, against the New York Rangers at Madison Square Garden, going pointless in 8:26 of ice time in a 2–0 Ottawa victory.

Daugaviņš scored his first-ever NHL goal on October 30, 2011, beating Jonas Gustavsson of the Toronto Maple Leafs in a 3–2 Ottawa victory. As the 2011–12 season progressed, Daugaviņš became a regular in the Ottawa lineup, playing 65 games and scoring five goals and six assists. In July 2012, he was scheduled for an arbitration hearing with the Senators, but the salary negotiation process was avoided when he agreed with the team to a one-year, one-way deal worth $635,000.

After his fifth season in the KHL and completing his third season with Torpedo Nizhny Novgorod in 2017–18, Daugaviņš left as a free agent to sign a two-year contract with his fourth KHL club, Spartak Moscow, on May 3, 2018.

After two productive seasons with Spartak, Daugaviņš left as a free agent, signing a one-year contract with HC Vityaz on May 3, 2020.

On June 10, 2021, Daugaviņš returned to the National League and signed a two-year deal with SC Bern. He left Bern after just one season with Bern, signing for German club, Iserlohn Roosters in the Deutsche Eishockey Liga (DEL), on August 8, 2022.

In the 2022–23 season with the Roosters, he led the team in scoring with 21 goals and 49 points through 55 regular season games. With Iserlohn missing the playoffs for a second consecutive season, he left the club at the conclusion of his contract on March 10, 2023.

Personal life
In 2013 he married Santa Seile, whom he met online, at the Roman Catholic Church of Mary Magdalene.

Career statistics

Regular season and playoffs

International

Awards and honours

References

External links
 

1988 births
Living people
SC Bern players
Binghamton Senators players
Boston Bruins players
Dinamo Riga players
Genève-Servette HC players
HC Dynamo Moscow players
HK Riga 2000 players
HC Spartak Moscow players
Ice hockey players at the 2010 Winter Olympics
Ice hockey players at the 2014 Winter Olympics
Ice hockey players at the 2022 Winter Olympics
Iserlohn Roosters players
Latvian ice hockey left wingers
Mississauga St. Michael's Majors players
Olympic ice hockey players of Latvia
Ottawa Senators draft picks
Ottawa Senators players
Ice hockey people from Riga
Toronto St. Michael's Majors players
Torpedo Nizhny Novgorod players
HC Vityaz players